Temple of Birth is an album by American jazz flautist Jeremy Steig released on the Columbia label in 1975.

Track listing
All compositions by Jeremy Steig except where noted
 "King Tut Strut" (Jeremy Steig, Richard Beirach, Alphonse Mouzon, Anthony Jackson, Ray Mantilla, Johnny Winter) − 8:38
 "Gale" (Beirach) − 2:35
 "Ouanga" (Steig, Beirach, Mouzon, Jackson, Mantilla, Winter) − 7:58
 "Mountain Dew Dues" (Steig, Winter) − 3:53
 "Goose Bumps" (Mouzon) − 3:56
 "Belly Up" − 3:16
 "Temple of Birth" − 2:14
 "Shifte-Telle Mama" − 9:39
 "Rupunzel" (Steig, Beirach) − 2:51

Personnel
Jeremy Steig – flute, Armstrong bass flute
Johnny Winter − acoustic guitar, electric guitar (tracks 1, 3 & 4)
Richie Beirach − acoustic piano, electric piano
Anthony Jackson − bass guitar (tracks 1-6 & 8)
Alphonse Mouzon – drums (tracks 1-6 & 8)
Ray Mantilla − congas, percussion (tracks 1-4, 6 & 8)

References

Columbia Records albums
Jeremy Steig albums
1975 albums
Albums recorded at Electric Lady Studios